Tufanganj Mahavidyalaya, established in 1971, is the oldest college in the sub-division of Tufanganj under the district of Cooch Behar. It offers undergraduate courses in arts, commerce and sciences. The campus of the college is green with trees and flower plants. The college also has NCC (13 Bengal and 7 Bengal Bn NCC Unit) wing which performs under the careful supervision of Shri Bhupen Barman, newly trained Associate National Cadets Corps Officer (ANO). It is affiliated to  Cooch Behar Panchanan Barma University.

Departments

Science

 Chemistry
 Botany
 Zoology

Arts and Commerce

Bengali
English
Sanskrit
History
Geography
Political Science
Sociology
Philosophy
Economics
Commerce

College Hostel

Accreditation
The college is recognized by the University Grants Commission (UGC). It has been re-accredited and awarded B+ grade by the National Assessment and Accreditation Council (NAAC).

See also

References

External links
Tufanganj Mahavidyalaya

Universities and colleges in Cooch Behar district
Colleges affiliated to Cooch Behar Panchanan Barma University
Academic institutions formerly affiliated with the University of North Bengal
Educational institutions established in 1971
1971 establishments in West Bengal